Pietro Cunti (born September 3, 1962) is a former Swiss professional ice hockey centre who last played for SC Bern in Switzerland's National League A.

Cunti has participated as a member of the Swiss national team at the 1988 Winter Olympics.

References

External links

1962 births
Living people
Ice hockey players at the 1988 Winter Olympics
Olympic ice hockey players of Switzerland
SC Bern players
Swiss ice hockey centres
People from Chur
Sportspeople from Graubünden